Maznun Mizan, commonly known as Mizan, is a Bangladeshi film and television actor, director. He became a favourite with the audience after his performance in Humayun Ahmed's film 'Noy Number Bipod Sonket'. Some of the notable films he has acted in include "Noy Number Bipod Sonket", Bhuvan Majhi, Gondi, Mission Extreme, Amar Ache Jol.

Early life and career 
In 1995, Maznon Mizan first started working on TV with a passing shot in Shahidul Haque Khan's play 'Kash Boner Kanya'. He joined the Dhaka Theater in 1999 by acting in the play 'Merchant of Venice'. Mizan worked on Kothar Ful, a special television drama based on Bangabandhu's historic 7th March broadcast in 2020, which was produced by Mohammad Imam. In 2018, he appeared in the film Bhuvan Majhi, which was co-produced by India and Bangladesh. Bhuban Majhi is a Bangladeshi film based on the Bangladeshi War of Independence.

Works

Films

Television Drama

References

Extra links 

 

Bangladeshi film actors
Bangladeshi television actors
Year of birth missing (living people)
Living people